Baker Mill Branch is a  long 2nd order tributary to Deep Creek in Sussex County, Delaware.  This is the only stream of this name in the United States.

Course
Baker Mill Branch is formed at the confluence of Old Ditch and Black Savannah Ditch about 0.5 miles southeast of Concord, Delaware, and then flows north-northwest to join Deep Creek about 0.5 miles east of Concord.

Watershed
Baker Mill Branch drains  of area, receives about 45.1 in/year of precipitation, has a wetness index of 705.67, and is about 19% forested.

See also
List of rivers of Delaware

References

Rivers of Delaware
Rivers of Sussex County, Delaware